Ghunkarah is a town in Trashigang District in eastern Bhutan. It has an elevation of 1,650m above sea level.

References

External links 
Satellite map at Maplandia.com

Populated places in Bhutan